Mineral Township is a township in Cherokee County, Kansas, USA.  As of the 2000 census, its population was 254.

Geography
The community of Scammon sits on it western border with Ross Township. According to the USGS, it contains three cemeteries: Hosey Hill, Lone Elm and Saint Bridget.

References
 USGS Geographic Names Information System (GNIS)

External links
 City-Data.com

Townships in Cherokee County, Kansas
Townships in Kansas